Tipped Off is a 1923 American silent drama film directed by Finis Fox and starring Arline Pretty, Noah Beery and Stuart Holmes. It was distributed by the independent Playgoers Pictures.

Synopsis
Mildred Garson, the fiancée of playwright Anthony Moore wants to star in his new crime drama. In order to convince him she stages a fake burglary at her home with the help of her brother and sister. However a real-life robbery takes place in which the butler is shot and Mildred kidnapped.

Cast
 Arline Pretty as 	Mildred Garson
 Harold Miller as 	Anthony Moore
 Tom Santschi as 'The Fox,' Dan Grogan
 Noah Beery as Chang Wo
 Stuart Holmes as Sidney Matthews
 Zella Gray as Rita Garson, Rita's Sister
 Tom O'Brien as Jim 'Pug' Murphy, Mildred's Brother
 Bessie Wong as 	Chinese Maid
 James Alamo as Chuck Morrison, Henchman
 Jimmie Truax as Baldy Bates, Henchman
 S.D. Wilcox as 	The Detective Sergeant 
 James Wang as Chang Wu's Major-domo
 Scotty MacGregor as 	The Stage Director

References

Bibliography
 Connelly, Robert B. The Silents: Silent Feature Films, 1910-36, Volume 40, Issue 2. December Press, 1998.
 Munden, Kenneth White. The American Film Institute Catalog of Motion Pictures Produced in the United States, Part 1. University of California Press, 1997.

External links
 

1923 films
1923 drama films
1920s English-language films
American silent feature films
Silent American drama films
Films directed by Finis Fox
American black-and-white films
1920s American films